Floyd Arthur "Baldy" Harper (February 7, 1905 – April 1973) was an American academic, economist and writer who was best known for founding the Institute for Humane Studies in 1961.

Personal life
Baldy Harper was born and raised in Middleville, Michigan and graduated from Michigan State University. He went on to obtain a doctorate in agricultural economics from Cornell University. Economist Herbert J. Davenport was influential to Harper during his time at Cornell.

In 1930, Harper married Marguerite Kaechele. The couple had four children: Barbara, Harriet, Helen, and Larry.

Career
The Federal Farm Board employed Harper as a research field agent in 1930 and 1931. He worked as a business analyst for the Farm Credit Association in 1934. In academia Harper spent 19 years as a professor of marketing at Cornell University and in 1937 was appointed acting head of the Department of Agricultural economics at the University of Puerto Rico. He left Cornell in 1946 after university officials decided that he should not be assigning readings of Austrian economist Friedrich Hayek's work. In 1946, Harper helped Leonard Read start the Foundation for Economic Education. A member of the Mont Pelerin Society, Harper was present at the group's first meeting in 1947 along with Friedrich Hayek, Ludwig Von Mises, Milton Friedman, and Karl Popper. Harper served on the staff of the Foundation for Economic Education until 1958, when he became a co-director of the William Volker Fund, a position he held until 1961. In the early 1960s, Harper served as a visiting professor of moral philosophy at Wabash College. Harper is best known for founding the Institute for Humane Studies. Initially he served as the Institute's secretary and treasurer. In 1965 he became the Institute's president, a position he held until his death in 1973.

Institute for Humane Studies

Harper founded the Institute for Humane Studies in 1961 in Menlo Park, California.
The Institute, which began in Harper's garage, is a non-profit organization that offers educational and career programs. The educational programs include seminars, scholarships to undergraduate and graduate students, an archive of recorded lectures, and an interactive website based on a multi-axis model of political thought. The career assistance programs include paid internships for students and recent graduates, a networking website for classical liberal academics, and recognition of alumni accomplishments.
Initially serving as the secretary and treasurer, Harper became the Institute's president in 1966, a position he held until his death in 1973. After beginning an association with George Mason University, Leonard Liggio, Walter Grinder, and John Blundell moved the institute to Fairfax, Virginia in 1985. The organization is currently located at 3434 Washington Blvd. on the George Mason University Arlington campus.

Legacy
Mentoring a network of classical liberal scholars, building institutions, encouraging scholarship, and laying out strategy and practice for the libertarian movement is where Harper's influence is visible today. Current Institute for Humane Studies chairman of the board Charles Koch said that Harper's book, Why Wages Rise, influenced his philosophical framework. In 1978 and 1979 the Institute for Humane Studies published The Writings of F. A. Harper. Koch wrote the tribute section, saying, "Of all the teachers of liberty, none was as well-beloved as Baldy, for it was he who taught the teachers and, in teaching, taught them humility and gentleness."

The Mercatus Center at George Mason University established the F.A. Harper Professorship in Economics, a position currently held by Christopher Coyne. In October 2011, Coyne co-authored an article entitled War and Liberty: Wisdom From Leonard E. Read and F. A. 'Baldy' Harper. The article reviews the main themes of Harper's anti-war pamphlet In Search of Peace and argues that Harper's ideas are as important and relevant today as they were in 1950.

Works

 
 
 
 
 
 
 
 
 
 
 
  v1 v2

References

1905 births
1973 deaths
20th-century American economists
American economics writers
American libertarians
American male non-fiction writers
American political writers
Cornell University College of Agriculture and Life Sciences alumni
Cornell University faculty
Libertarian economists
Michigan State University alumni
People from Barry County, Michigan
Economists from Michigan
20th-century American male writers